David Packer (born August 25, 1962) is an American actor.

Early life
He was born on August 25, 1962 in Passaic, New Jersey.

Career
His first starring role was as the human traitor Daniel Bernstein in the 1983 NBC miniseries V. He reprised the role in the 1984 sequel V: The Final Battle.

Packer subsequently appeared in such films as You Can't Hurry Love, Strange Days, True Crime and Infested. In 1994, he received the Cable Ace Award for his role as Leo in the 1993 television series Big Al. He also appeared in the video game Double Switch as Jeff, who leads the band Scream, and has made guest appearances in numerous television shows such as  ER, Fame, St. Elsewhere, thirtysomething, The Division, CSI: Crime Scene Investigation, CSI: NY and M*A*S*H.

Packer was good friends with the actress Dominique Dunne (replaced by actress Blair Tefkin in the Robin Maxwell role in V) and was rehearsing a scene with her for the TV mini-series V the night she was strangled by her ex-boyfriend (John Thomas Sweeney).

Packer currently serves as an Operations Manager at Qualfon, a contact center outsourcer, where Packer oversees the daily operations of a travel and lifestyle service to credit card holders.

Filmography

External links
 

1962 births
Living people
American male film actors
American male television actors
People from Passaic, New Jersey
Male actors from New Jersey
20th-century American male actors
21st-century American male actors